Kiamba is a small Queensland, rural locality within Australia. Region of Kiamba is sunshine coast, state of Queensland, Australia. Koppen climate type is Cfa : Humid subtropical climate. It is located approximately 100 km from the capital Brisbane covering an area of 16.481 square kilometres. Kiamba has a recorded population of 191 residents.  There is Australian Eastern Standard Time zone Australia/Brisbane.

Geography
The south branch of the Maroochy River forms much of the southern boundary before flowing through to the north-east where it enters the Wappa Dam, also in the locality. Rocky Creek enters from the north-west and flows east to join the South Maroochy above the dam.

References

Further reading 

 
 

Suburbs of the Sunshine Coast Region
Localities in Queensland